Halls Branch is a  long 2nd order tributary to Lovills Creek in Carroll County, Virginia.

Course 
Halls Branch rises about 4 miles north-northwest of Cana, Virginia in Carroll County and then flows southeast to join Lovills Creek about 1 mile south of Cana.

Watershed 
Halls Branch drains  of area, receives about 49.9 in/year of precipitation, has a wetness index of 314.13, and is about 53% forested.

See also 
 List of Virginia Rivers

References 

Rivers of Carroll County, Virginia
Rivers of Virginia